, the following species of molluscs are recognised in the genus Calliostoma.

A
 
Calliostoma adelae 
Calliostoma admirandum 
Calliostoma adspersum 
Calliostoma aequisculptum 
Calliostoma africanum 
Calliostoma agalma 
Calliostoma agrigentinum 
Calliostoma aikeni 
Calliostoma alboregium 
Calliostoma alisi 
Calliostoma allporti 
Calliostoma altena 
Calliostoma alternatum 
Calliostoma alternum 
Calliostoma amamiense 
Calliostoma anderssoni 
Calliostoma angolense 
Calliostoma annulatum 
Calliostoma anseeuwi 
Calliostoma antonii 
Calliostoma apicinum 
Calliostoma apicisuperi 
Calliostoma aporia 
Calliostoma aprosceptum 
Calliostoma argentum 
Calliostoma arx 
Calliostoma aulicum 
Calliostoma aurora 
Calliostoma axelolssoni

B

Calliostoma babelicum 
Calliostoma baccatum 
Calliostoma bairdii 
Calliostoma barbouri 
Calliostoma basulense 
Calliostoma belauense 
Calliostoma bellatrix 
Calliostoma benedicti 
Calliostoma bermudense 
Calliostoma biangulatum 
Calliostoma bigelowi 
Calliostoma bituberculatum 
Calliostoma bonita 
Calliostoma boscianum 
Calliostoma brugnonei 
Calliostoma brunneopictum 
Calliostoma brunneum 
Calliostoma bullatum 
Calliostoma bullisi

C

Calliostoma canaliculatum 
Calliostoma canaliculatum 
Calliostoma carcellesi 
Calliostoma caribbechinatum 
Calliostoma caroli 
Calliostoma cheni 
Calliostoma chinoi 
Calliostoma chlorum 
Calliostoma chuni 
Calliostoma cinctellum 
Calliostoma circumcinctum 
Calliostoma circus 
Calliostoma cleopatra 
Calliostoma cnidophilum 
Calliostoma cochlias 
Calliostoma columnarium 
Calliostoma connyae 
Calliostoma consimile 
Calliostoma contractum 
Calliostoma conulus 
Calliostoma coppingeri 
Calliostoma crassicostatum 
Calliostoma crossleyae 
Calliostoma cubense 
Calliostoma cyrtoida

D

Calliostoma debile 
Calliostoma decapitatum 
Calliostoma decipiens 
Calliostoma dedonderi 
Calliostoma delonguevilleae 
Calliostoma dentatum 
Calliostoma depictum 
Calliostoma diaphoros 
Calliostoma doncorni 
Calliostoma duricastellum

E

Calliostoma elegantulum 
Calliostoma emmanueli 
Calliostoma escondidum 
Calliostoma euglyptum 
Calliostoma eximium

F

Calliostoma fascinans 
Calliostoma fernandesi 
Calliostoma fernandezi 
Calliostoma filiareginae 
Calliostoma fonki 
Calliostoma formosense 
Calliostoma formosissimum 
Calliostoma freiwaldi 
Calliostoma fucosum 
Calliostoma funiculare 
Calliostoma funiculatum

G

Calliostoma galea 
Calliostoma gavaldoni 
Calliostoma gemmosum 
Calliostoma gemmulatum 
Calliostoma gibbuliforme 
Calliostoma gloriosum 
Calliostoma gordanum 
Calliostoma granulatum 
Calliostoma gratiosum 
Calliostoma grimaldii 
Calliostoma grohi 
Calliostoma gualterianum 
Calliostoma gubbiolii 
Calliostoma guerreroense 
Calliostoma guesti 
Calliostoma guphili

H

Calliostoma haapaiense 
Calliostoma halibrectum 
Calliostoma hassler 
Calliostoma hayamanum 
Calliostoma hayashii 
Calliostoma hedleyi 
Calliostoma hematomenon 
Calliostoma hendersoni 
Calliostoma herberti 
Calliostoma hernandezi 
Calliostoma heros 
Calliostoma heugteni 
Calliostoma hexalyssion 
Calliostoma hilare 
Calliostoma hirondellei 
Calliostoma hirtum 
Calliostoma houarti 
Calliostoma hungi

I

Calliostoma imperiale 
Calliostoma indiana 
Calliostoma insigne 
Calliostoma irerense 
Calliostoma iridescens 
Calliostoma iridium 
Calliostoma iris 
Calliostoma irisans 
Calliostoma iwamotoi 
Calliostoma iwaotakii

J

Calliostoma jackelynae 
Calliostoma jacquelinae 
Calliostoma javanicum 
Calliostoma jeanneae 
Calliostoma joanneae 
Calliostoma jucundum 
Calliostoma jujubinum

K

Calliostoma kampsa 
Calliostoma katoi 
Calliostoma katorii 
Calliostoma katsunakamai 
Calliostoma keenae 
Calliostoma kleppi 
Calliostoma koma 
Calliostoma kurodai

L

Calliostoma lamellatum 
Calliostoma laugieri 
Calliostoma layardi 
Calliostoma leanum 
Calliostoma legrandi 
Calliostoma leptophyma 
Calliostoma lequementorum 
Calliostoma lesporti 
Calliostoma levibasis 
Calliostoma ligatum 
Calliostoma lithocolletum 
Calliostoma lividum 
Calliostoma lui

M

Calliostoma madagascarense 
Calliostoma madatechnema 
Calliostoma maekawai 
Calliostoma magaldii 
Calliostoma mapucherum 
Calliostoma margaretae 
Calliostoma margaritissimum 
Calliostoma mariae 
Calliostoma marionae 
Calliostoma marisflavi 
Calliostoma marshalli 
Calliostoma maurolici 
Calliostoma mcleani 
Calliostoma melliferum 
Calliostoma mesemorinon 
Calliostoma metabolicum 
Calliostoma michaeli 
Calliostoma microgemmatum 
Calliostoma mikikoae 
Calliostoma militare 
Calliostoma milletechinatum 
Calliostoma milletigranum 
Calliostoma milneedwardsi 
Calliostoma miotorulosum 
Calliostoma miotumidum 
Calliostoma modestulum 
Calliostoma moebiusi 
Calliostoma mohtatae 
Calliostoma moscatellii

N

Calliostoma nakamigawai 
Calliostoma nanshaense 
Calliostoma nepheloide 
Calliostoma nordenskjoldi 
Calliostoma normani 
Calliostoma nudiusculum 
Calliostoma nudum

O

Calliostoma occidentale 
Calliostoma ocellatum 
Calliostoma opalinum 
Calliostoma opisthostenum 
Calliostoma oregon 
Calliostoma orion 
Calliostoma ornatum 
Calliostoma otukai

P

Calliostoma pagodulum 
Calliostoma palmeri 
Calliostoma parvajuba 
Calliostoma paucicostatum 
Calliostoma peregrinum 
Calliostoma perfragile 
Calliostoma pertinax 
Calliostoma philippei 
Calliostoma picturatum 
Calliostoma pillsburyae 
Calliostoma planospirum 
Calliostoma polysarkon 
Calliostoma poppei 
Calliostoma praecedens 
Calliostoma presselierense 
Calliostoma problematicum 
Calliostoma psyche 
Calliostoma pulchrum 
Calliostoma purpureum 
Calliostoma pyrron

Q

Calliostoma quadricolor 
Calliostoma quaggaoides

R

Calliostoma rema 
Calliostoma roseolum 
Calliostoma rosewateri 
Calliostoma rota 
Calliostoma rubroscalptum 
Calliostoma rude 
Calliostoma rufomaculatum

S

Calliostoma sagamiense 
Calliostoma sakashitai 
Calliostoma sanjaimense 
Calliostoma santacruzanum 
Calliostoma sapidum 
Calliostoma sarcodum 
Calliostoma sayanum 
Calliostoma scalenum 
Calliostoma schroederi 
Calliostoma scobinatum 
Calliostoma scotti 
Calliostoma scurra 
Calliostoma scutiforme 
Calliostoma semisuave 
Calliostoma serratulum 
Calliostoma shawni 
Calliostoma shinagawaense 
Calliostoma simodense 
Calliostoma simplex 
Calliostoma soyoae 
Calliostoma spesa 
Calliostoma spinosum 
Calliostoma springeri 
Calliostoma stephanephorum 
Calliostoma stirophorum 
Calliostoma strobilos 
Calliostoma sturi 
Calliostoma subalboroseum 
Calliostoma subexcavatum 
Calliostoma sublaeve 
Calliostoma suduirauti 
Calliostoma sugitanii 
Calliostoma supragranosum 
Calliostoma swinneni 
Calliostoma syungokannoi

T

Calliostoma takaseanum 
Calliostoma takujii 
Calliostoma tampaense 
Calliostoma tauromiliare 
Calliostoma tenebrosum 
Calliostoma textor 
Calliostoma thachi 
Calliostoma thrincoma 
Calliostoma ticaonicum 
Calliostoma tittarium 
Calliostoma tornatum 
Calliostoma torrei 
Calliostoma trachystum 
Calliostoma tranquebaricum 
Calliostoma tricolor 
Calliostoma triporcatum 
Calliostoma tropis 
Calliostoma trotini 
Calliostoma tsuchiyai 
Calliostoma tumidosolidum 
Calliostoma tupinamba 
Calliostoma turbinum

U

Calliostoma umbellum 
Calliostoma uranipponense

V

Calliostoma valkuri 
Calliostoma variegatum 
Calliostoma vaubanoides 
Calliostoma veleroae 
Calliostoma venustum 
Calliostoma verrucosum 
Calliostoma vibrayanum 
Calliostoma vicdani 
Calliostoma vilvensi 
Calliostoma virescens 
Calliostoma virginicum 
Calliostoma virgo 
Calliostoma viscardii

X

Calliostoma xanthos 
Calliostoma xylocinnamomum

Y

Calliostoma yingchenae 
Calliostoma yucatecanum

Z

Calliostoma zietzi 
Calliostoma zizyphinum

References

Calliostoma
Calliostoma